Al Johnson may refer to:

Sports

American football
 Al Johnson (American football coach) (1922–2011), American football player and coach
 Al Johnson (defensive back) (born 1950), American football defensive back and running back
 Al Johnson (guard) (born 1979), American football guard

Other sports
 Al Johnson (baseball executive) (1860–1901), American Major League Baseball team owner
 Al Johnson (basketball) (1913–1991), American professional basketball player in the NBL
 Al Johnson (pitcher) (fl. 1936), American baseball player
 Al Johnson (ice hockey) (1935–2019), Canadian ice hockey player

Music
 Al "Carnival Time" Johnson (born 1939), New Orleans singer and pianist
 Al Johnson (musician) (1948–2013), American R&B singer who was a member of The Unifics

Politics
 Al Johnson (politician) (born 1939), Canadian Member of Parliament
 Boris Johnson (born 1964), former prime minister of the United Kingdom, whose first name is Alexander and is called "Al" by his family

Others
 Albert Wesley Johnson (1923–2010), Canadian Broadcasting Corporation president
 Al Johnson, owner of Al Johnson's Swedish Restaurant in Sister Bay, Wisconsin, United States

See also
 Alan Johnson (disambiguation)
 Albert Johnson (disambiguation)
 Alvin Johnson (disambiguation)
 Alfred Johnson (disambiguation)